Abyssochrysos xouthos is a species of sea snail, a marine gastropod mollusk in the family Abyssochrysidae.

Distribution
This marine species occurs off Oman.

References

xouthos
Gastropods described in 2000